Charles Lota (born 17 November 1978) is a Zambian former footballer who played as a midfielder for Konkola Blades, Kabwe Warriors and Red Arrows, as well as the Zambia national football team. He played for Zambia at the 2002 Africa Cup of Nations.

References

1978 births
Living people
Zambian footballers
Association football midfielders
Konkola Blades F.C. players
Kabwe Warriors F.C. players
Red Arrows F.C. players
Zambia international footballers
2002 African Cup of Nations players